Jewel Hampton (born December 23, 1989) is an American football running back who is currently a free agent. He played college football at Southern Illinois and signed with the San Francisco 49ers as an undrafted free agent in 2012.

Early years
He attended Warren Central High School in Indianapolis. He was named to the First-team All-State in his senior season after he rushed for 2,095 rushing yards and 27 rushing touchdowns.

College career

University of Iowa
He played three seasons at Iowa and finished with a total of 577 rushing yards, 8 rushing touchdowns, 3 receptions and 6 receiving yards and one receiving touchdown.

Southern Illinois
In his Junior season at Southern Illinois, he was selected as MVFC Newcomer of the Year following the conclusion of the season. He was selected to the Second-team All-Conference team in his senior season. He was named to the MVFC All-Newcomer team. He was a two-time MVFC Newcomer of the Week during his junior season.

Professional career

San Francisco 49ers
On May 1, 2012, Hampton signed with the San Francisco 49ers as an undrafted free agent. On July 23, 2012, he was placed on the Non-Football Injury list for undisclosed injury. On November 27, 2012, he was activated from the Non-Football Injury list. The 49ers waived Hampton on August 25, 2014.

Montreal Alouettes
On June 4, 2015, Hampton signed with the Montreal Alouettes of the Canadian Football League. On June 15, 2016, Hampton was released.

References

External links
Southern Illinois Salukis bio
San Francisco 49ers bio

1989 births
Living people
American football running backs
Iowa Hawkeyes football players
San Francisco 49ers players
Southern Illinois Salukis football players
Players of American football from Indianapolis
Players of Canadian football from Indianapolis
Montreal Alouettes players